This is a list of fermented foods, which are foods produced or preserved by the action of microorganisms. In this context, fermentation typically refers to the fermentation of sugar to alcohol using yeast, but other fermentation processes involve the use of bacteria such as lactobacillus, including the making of foods such as yogurt and sauerkraut. Many fermented foods are mass produced using industrial fermentation processes. The science of fermentation is known as zymology.

Many pickled or soured foods are fermented as part of the pickling or souring process, but many are simply processed with brine, vinegar, or another acid such as lemon juice.



Fermented foods

Fermented beans and seeds

Fermented cheeses 

Most cheeses (all but fresh cheeses) are fermented as part of their production.

Fermented condiments

Fermented creams and yogurts

Fermented grains and grain-based foods

Fermented fruits and vegetables

Fermented meat and seafood

Fermented drinks and beverages

This is a list of fermented drinks. Although many fermented drinks are alcoholic beverages, not all fermented drinks are alcoholic.

See also

 Fermentation (wine)
 Food microbiology
 List of fermented soy products
 List of fish sauces
 List of pickled foods
 Fermented milk products

References

 
Fermented foods
Fermented drinks